My Wife's Friends is a 1949 West German comedy film directed by Hans Deppe and starring Sonja Ziemann, Grethe Weiser and Gerda Maurus.

It was made by Real Film at the Wandsbek Studios in Hamburg. The film's sets were designed by Herbert Kirchhoff and Mathias Matthies.

Cast
 Sonja Ziemann as Fee Freiberg - Kabarettistin
 Grethe Weiser as Lotte - Mädchen bei Brinkmann
 Gerda Maurus as Frau Grete Brinkmann
 Carl-Heinz Schroth as Walter Brinkmann - Bücherrevisor
 Albert Florath as Herr Fricke - Wirt vom Heidehof
 Arno Assmann as Bernd Freiberg - Textdichter
 Carl Voscherau as Wild - und Geflügelhändler Kühn
 Horst Gentzen as Bodo Kühn - Genannt Bulli
 Michael Chevalier as Herbert Brinkmann - Kind
 Baerbel Lutz as Uschi Brinkmann, Kind
 Heinz Schröder as Hänschen Brinkmann - Kind
 Mia Adomat
 Ludwig Röger
 Horst von Otto

References

Bibliography 
 Bock, Hans-Michael & Bergfelder, Tim. The Concise CineGraph. Encyclopedia of German Cinema. Berghahn Books, 2009.

External links 
 

1949 films
West German films
German comedy films
1949 comedy films
1940s German-language films
Films directed by Hans Deppe
Real Film films
Films shot at Wandsbek Studios
German black-and-white films
1940s German films